Hypatopa sais is a moth in the family Blastobasidae. It is found in Costa Rica.

The length of the forewings is about 5.9 mm. The forewings are brownish grey intermixed with pale brownish-grey scales and a few dark-brown scales. The hindwings are translucent pale brown, gradually darkening towards the apex.

Etymology
The specific name refers to Sais, the old capital of Lower Egypt.

References

Moths described in 2013
Hypatopa